The 1999 Nigerian Senate election in Kaduna State was held on February 20, 1999, to elect members of the Nigerian Senate to represent Kaduna State. Dalhatu Tafida representing Kaduna North and Haruna Aziz Zeego representing Kaduna South won on the platform of Peoples Democratic Party, while Mohammed Aruwa representing Kaduna Central won on the platform of the All Nigeria Peoples Party.

Overview

Summary

Results

Kaduna North 
The election was won by Dalhatu Tafida of the Peoples Democratic Party.

Kaduna South 
The election was won by Haruna Aziz Zeego of the Peoples Democratic Party.

Kaduna Central 
The election was won by Mohammed Aruwa of the All Nigeria Peoples Party.

References 

February 1999 events in Nigeria
Kad
Kaduna State Senate elections